Juan Carlos Ferrero and Carlos Moyá were the defending champions and successfully defended their title, defeating Sébastien Grosjean and Fabrice Santoro in the final, 6–4, 6–4.

Draw

Final

Group A
Standings are determined by: 1. number of wins; 2. number of matches; 3. in three-players-ties, percentage of sets won, or of games won; 4. steering-committee decision.

Group B
Standings are determined by: 1. number of wins; 2. number of matches; 3. in three-players-ties, percentage of sets won, or of games won; 4. steering-committee decision.

References
Main Draw
http://www.rolandgarros.com/en_FR/scores/draws/Legends_OD.pdf

Legends Under 45 Doubles